Gyan is the debut studio album by Australian singer-songwriter Gyan, released in October 1989. The album peaked number 27 on the ARIA chart and was certified gold.

At the ARIA Music Awards of 1990, the album was nominated for three awards; winning the ARIA Award for Best New Talent.

Track listing
 "Train of Thought" (Gyan) – 2:54
 "Wait" (Gyan / G.Frost / G.Stapleton) – 3:38
 "Straight Lines" (Gyan/O'Connor) – 4:38
 "Lead Me On" (Gyan/O'Connor) – 2:44
 "How Can You" (Gyan) – 4:18
 "Head over Heels" (Gyan/O'Connor) – 3:05
 "It's Alright" (Gyan) – 3:43
 "Don't Ask Me Why" (Gyan) – 4:53
 "Couldn't I Be?" (Gyan/O'Connor) – 3:30
 "Don't Underestimate Me" (Gyan) – 3:32
 "Black Wedding Ring" (Gyan/O'Connor) – 4:52

Personnel
Gyan: Vocals, Keyboards, drum programming
Mark O'Connor: Keyboards, drum programming
Rick Chadwick: Keyboards
Rex Goh, Bret Williams, David Sparks: Guitars
Geoff Mercer: Dobro on "Straight Lines"
Jackie Orszaczky: Bass, additional keyboards, drum programming
Hamish Stewart: Drums, percussion
Hanuman Dass: Drums, drum programming
Sunil Da Silva: Percussion
Jump Back Jack Horn Section: Horns
Andy Thompson: Saxophone on "Wait"

Charts

Certifications

References

1989 debut albums
ARIA Award-winning albums
Gyan Evans albums
Albums produced by Charles Fisher (producer)